Cobblestone Runway is the sixth studio album from Canadian singer-songwriter Ron Sexsmith. The album also features a second version of the song "Gold in Them Hills" as a bonus, featuring a duet vocal with Coldplay's Chris Martin. Some printings of the album came with a second disc, a re-release of "Grand Opera Lane."

In 2012, Katie Melua released a version of "Gold in Them Hills" from her album, Secret Symphony.

Track listing

All songs written by Ronald Eldon Sexsmith.

 "Former Glory" – 2:55
 "These Days" – 3:23
 "Least That I Can Do" – 4:26
 "God Loves Everyone" – 3:09
 "Disappearing Act" – 3:41
 "For a Moment There" – 3:04
 "Gold in Them Hills" – 3:34
 "Heart's Desire" – 4:20
 "Dragonfly on Bay Street" – 3:24
 "The Less I Know" – 4:13
 "Up the Road" – 2:54
 "Best Friends" – 1:53
 "You Cross My Mind" (Japanese Bonus Track) 
 "Gold in Them Hills (Remix)" (featuring Chris Martin) – 3:40

Personnel
 Ron Sexsmith – vocals, acoustic guitar, electric guitar, piano
 Martin Terefe – producer, bass, synthesizers, hi-hats, backing vocals, marimbas
 Glen Scott – Fender Rhodes, backing vocals
 Christer Jansson – drums, percussion, brushes
 Claes Bjorklund – noises, string machine, grooves, synth bass, vocoder, synthesizers, drums, piano, bass, Fender Rhodes, mirage operator, funk guitar
 Andreas Olsson – bells, electronic grooves, noises
 Kim Fleming – choir
 George Pendergrass – choir
 Chris Willis – choir
 Steve Crawford – choir
 Gale West – choir
 David Davidson – violin, string arranger
 David Angell – violin
 Kristin Wilkinson – viola
 John Catchings – cello
 Chris Martin – vocals

References

2002 albums
Nettwerk Records albums
Ron Sexsmith albums